Calliopsis puellae is a species of bee in the family Andrenidae. It is found in Central America and North America.

The species' type specimen was collected by Wilmatte Porter Cockerell and her great-niece, Lelah Milene Porter (1927-2001). It is now at Harvard University's Museum of Comparative Zoology. The species was named (as Spinoliella puellae) by Wilmatte's husband, Theodore Dru Alison Cockerell, who wrote:

References

Further reading

 
 

Andrenidae
Articles created by Qbugbot
Insects described in 1933